Kensington United Reformed Church is a Grade II listed church in Allen Street, Kensington, London, England.

It was built in 1854–55 as Kensington Congregational Chapel.

Since the Union of the Congregational and Presbyterian churches in England and Wales in 1972, the church has been a member of the United Reformed Church.

Ministers

 Silvester Horne
 Caryl Micklem

References

External links
 

Congregational churches in London
Grade II listed churches in the Royal Borough of Kensington and Chelsea
Kensington
United Reformed churches in London